Narrative exposition is the insertion of background information within a story or narrative. This information can be about the setting, characters' backstories, prior plot events, historical context, etc. In literature, exposition appears in the form of expository writing embedded within the narrative. Exposition is one of four rhetorical modes (also known as modes of discourse), along with description, persuasion, and narration, as elucidated by Alexander Bain and John Genung.

In essays 
An expository paragraph presents facts, gives directions, defines terms, and so on. It should clearly inform readers about a specific subject.

An expository essay is one whose chief aim is to present information or to explain something. To expound is to set forth in detail, so a reader will learn some facts about a given subject. However, no essay is merely a set of facts. Behind all the details lies an attitude, a point of view. In exposition, as in other rhetorical modes, details must be selected and ordered according to the writer's sense of their importance and interest. Although the expository writer isn't primarily taking a stand on an issue, they can't—and shouldn't try to—keep their opinions completely hidden.

In fiction 
An information dump (or infodump) is a large drop of information by the author to provide background they deem necessary to continue the plot. This is ill-advised in narrative and is even worse when used in dialogue. There are cases where an information dump can work, but in many instances it slows down the plot or breaks immersion for the readers. Exposition works best when the author provides only the bare minimum of surface information and allows the readers to discover as they go.

Indirect exposition/incluing 

Indirect exposition, sometimes called incluing, is a technique of worldbuilding in which the reader is gradually exposed to background information about the world in which a story is set. The idea is to clue the readers in to the world the author is building without them being aware of it. This can be done in a number of ways: through dialogues, flashbacks, characters' thoughts, background details, in-universe media, or the narrator telling a backstory.

Indirect exposition has always occurred in storytelling incidentally, but is first clearly identified, in the modern literary world, in the writing of Rudyard Kipling. In his stories set in India like The Jungle Book, Kipling was faced with the problem of Western readers not knowing the culture and environment of that land, so he gradually developed the technique of explaining through example. But this was relatively subtle, compared to Kipling's science fiction stories, where he used the technique much more obviously and necessarily, to explain an entirely fantastic world unknown to any reader, in his Aerial Board of Control universe.

Kipling's writing influenced other science fiction writers, most notably the "Dean of Science Fiction", Robert Heinlein, who became known for his advanced rhetorical and storytelling techniques, including indirect exposition.

The word incluing is attributed to fantasy and science fiction author Jo Walton. She defined it as "the process of scattering information seamlessly through the text, as opposed to stopping the story to impart the information." "Information dump" (or info-dump) is the term given for overt exposition, which writers want to avoid. In an idiot lecture, characters tell each other information that needs to be explained for the purpose of the audience, but of which the characters in-universe would already be aware. Writers are advised to avoid writing dialogues beginning with "As you well know, Professor, a prime number is..."

See also 
Show, don't tell

Notes

References 
 
 
 

Narrative techniques
Fiction-writing mode